Acrocercops rhombiferellum is a moth of the family Gracillariidae. It is known from the United States (Texas).

References

rhombiferellum
Moths of North America
Moths described in 1912